Phaius antoninae is a species of orchid in the genus Phaius that was described in 2011 and is native to the Philippines. The type specimen was collected by Antonina G. Balzer in August 1997.

References

antoninae
Plants described in 2011
Orchids of the Philippines